Branden Dozier (born November 28, 1993) is an American gridiron football defensive back for the Calgary Stampeders of the Canadian Football League (CFL). He played college football with the UNC-Charlotte 49ers.

Early life and college career
Dozier played running back and defensive back at Washburn Rural High School, where he earned All-City honors before graduating in 2012. He then played at Butler County Community College, where he garnered all-Kansas Jayhawk honors as a defensive back. While at UNC Charlotte, he set a single-season tackle record.

Professional career
Dozier attended a Pittsburgh Steelers rookie mini-camp in 2016 but was not offered a contract.

Montreal Alouettes
After sitting out a year to complete his studies, he reached out to a member of the Montreal Alouettes front office, did a private workout, and was promptly signed to his first pro contract. For the 2017 CFL season, Dozier recorded 60 defensive tackles, including two sacks, as well as 14 special teams tackles. He also scored a touchdown on a 20-yard fumble return. He was the team's nominee for the league's Most Outstanding Rookie award. In 2018, he played in 17 games while recording 84 defensive tackles, 18 special teams tackles, and five interceptions en route to being named a 2018 CFL Eastern All-Star at safety. He was released by the Alouettes on May 13, 2019.

BC Lions
Dozier signed with the BC Lions on June 25, 2019.

Calgary Stampeders
As a free agent, he signed with Calgary Stampeders on February 11, 2020. After the CFL canceled the 2020 season due to the COVID-19 pandemic, Dozier chose to opt-out of his contract with the Stampeders on September 3, 2020. Despite opting out, he was technically still under contract with the Stampeders and signed an extension to remain with the club on February 2, 2021.

References

External links
Calgary Stampeders bio

Living people
1993 births
American football defensive backs
Canadian football defensive backs
American players of Canadian football
Montreal Alouettes players
Charlotte 49ers football players
Players of American football from Kansas
Sportspeople from Topeka, Kansas
Butler Grizzlies football players
BC Lions players
Calgary Stampeders players